A by-election was held for the Awarua electorate on 5 August 1897, for the seat vacated by Joseph Ward, which he had held since . Despite having had to resign due to bankruptcy, he exploited a legal loophole and was re-elected to the 13th New Zealand Parliament.

Background and election
Joseph Ward first won election to the  electorate in the 1897 election. He held many portfolios in the Seddon Ministry, including that of Treasurer (i.e. Minister of Finance), when Justice Williams declared him "hopelessly insolvent" in 1896. He was forced to resign his portfolios in Cabinet on 16 June. In 1897, he had to file for bankruptcy, and was adjudicated bankrupt on 8 July 1897. He was then legally obliged to resign his seat in Parliament, which he did on 14 July.

A loophole, however, meant that there was nothing to stop him simply contesting it again. He did so, and was re-elected with an increased majority.

Parliament passed a special Act on 13 October, the Awarua Seat Enquiry Act 1897, which required the Court of Appeal to urgently decide whether he could be re-elected to Parliament, and the court decided in his favour. The court judgement was published as AJHR H32 of 1897.

Ward actually gained considerable popularity as a result of his financial troubles; Ward was widely seen as a great benefactor of the Southland region, and public perceptions were that he was being persecuted by his enemies over an honest mistake. Gradually, Ward rebuilt his businesses, and paid off his debtors. Richard Seddon, still Prime Minister, quickly reappointed Ward to Cabinet.

1896 general election result

1897 by-election result
The following table gives the by-election results:

Notes

References

Awarua 1897
1897 elections in New Zealand
Politics of Southland, New Zealand